Mount Xiaowutai is a mountain located in Yu County in the northwest of the province of Hebei, China.

References 

Mountains of Hebei
Highest points of Chinese provinces
Yu County, Hebei
Geography of Zhangjiakou